The Energy Modeling Forum (EMF) is a structured forum for discussing important issues in energy and the environment. The EMF was established in 1976 at Stanford University. The EMF works through a series of ad hoc working groups, each focussing on a particular corporate or policy decision. The EMF provides a non-partisan platform that ensures objective consideration of opposing views.  Participation is by invitation.

Since the late-1990s, the EMF has made contributions to the economics of climate change, as witnessed in the reports of the Intergovernmental Panel on Climate Change (IPCC) and on integrated assessment modeling more generally.

John Weyant is the current director of the EMF.

Ethos 

The EMF was convened in 1976 over concerns that the insights that large-scale energy models could provide policymakers were being overshadowed by the "plethora of detailed quantitative results" being disseminated and discussed.  As a result, the EMF sought to bring energy modelers together to provide a proper context for their work.  Indeed, the EMF was "formed to foster better communication between the builders and users of energy models in energy planning and policy analysis".  The EMF periodically establishes  working groups to conduct studies on selected energy topics.  A working group then identifies relevant existing models and sets a series of tests to illuminate the basic structure and behavior of each model.  Results are compared and the strengths and weaknesses of each model is documented in a (as of 1982) freely available report.

List of EMF projects 

Reports for most of the completed projects are available from the EMF website.  Reports since 2006 have sometimes been published exclusively in special editions of (paywalled) academic journals instead.

See also 
 Open Energy Modelling Initiative – an open source energy modeling initiative centered on Europe

References

External links 

 EMF home page

Economics societies
Energy models
Energy organizations